Sheila Dikshit (née Kapoor; 31 March 1938 – 20 July 2019) was an Indian politician.  The longest-serving Chief Minister of Delhi, as well as the longest-serving female chief minister of any Indian state, she served for a period of 15 years beginning in 1998. Dikshit led Congress party to three consecutive electoral victories in Delhi.

Dikshit lost the December 2013 elections of the Delhi Legislative Assembly to the Bharatiya Janata Party, though Aam Aadmi Party formed a minority government with outside support from the INC, with Arvind Kejriwal as the chief minister. She briefly served as the Governor of Kerala in 2014. Dikshit was later declared a chief ministerial candidate for the Indian National Congress in the 2017 Uttar Pradesh Legislative Assembly election, but withdrew her nomination. She was appointed president of Delhi Pradesh Congress Committee on 10 January 2019 and remained in office until her death in July later that year.

Early years
Sheila Kapoor was born on 31 March 1938 in the city of Kapurthala in the Kapurthala Princely State of British India (now in Punjab, India) into a Punjabi Khatri family. Her father's name was Sanjay Kapoor. She was educated at the Convent of Jesus and Mary School in New Delhi and graduated with a Master of Arts degree in history from the Miranda House at the University of Delhi.

Political career 
Sheila Dikshit was handpicked by Rajiv Gandhi to be part of his council of ministers after he became the prime minister in 1984. During the period between 1984 and 1989, she represented Kannauj parliamentary constituency of Uttar Pradesh. As a member of Parliament, she served on the Estimates Committee of Lok Sabha. Dikshit also chaired the Implementation Committee for Commemoration of Forty Years of India's Independence and Jawaharlal Nehru centenary. She represented India at United Nations Commission on Status of Women for five years (1984–1989). She also served as a Union Minister during 1986–1989, first as the Minister of State for Parliamentary Affairs and later as a minister of state in the Prime Minister's Office. In Uttar Pradesh, she and her 82 colleagues were jailed in August 1990 for 23 days by the state government when she led a movement against the atrocities being committed against women.

Earlier, in the early 1970s, she was chairperson of the Young Women's Association and was instrumental in the setting up of two of the most successful hostels for working women in Delhi. She was also the secretary of the Indira Gandhi Memorial Trust.

In the 1998 parliamentary elections, Dikshit was defeated by Bharatiya Janata Party's Lal Bihari Tiwari in East Delhi constituency. Later in the year, Dikshit became Chief Minister of Delhi, a position she held until 2013. Dikshit represented the Gole Market assembly constituency in the 1998 and 2003 Assembly elections and New Delhi constituency from 2008.

In 2009 and 2013, Dikshit was investigated for alleged misuse of government funds, but no charges were brought.

Her party was wiped out in the 2013 Delhi Legislative Assembly election and Arvind Kejriwal, founder of the Aam Aadmi party , won the election in the New Delhi Assembly constituency by a margin of 25,864 votes. She resigned on 8 December 2013, but remained the caretaker chief minister of Delhi until the new government was sworn in on 28 December 2013. She was appointed the governor of Kerala in March 2014, but was forced to resign five months later. She contested the 2019 Lok Sabha Elections as the candidate for Indian National Congress in the North East Delhi Constituency but came second after Bharatiya Janata Party's Manoj Tiwari.

Personal life 
Dikshit was married to Vinod Dikshit, son of independence activist and former West Bengal governor Uma Shankar Dikshit from Unnao. He was an officer in the Indian Administrative Service.

Dikshit was the mother of two children: a son, Sandeep Dikshit, who is a former member of Parliament of the 15th Lok Sabha from East Delhi, and a daughter, Latika Dikshit Syed, who was married to Syed Mohammad Imran, an architect.

Dikshit underwent angioplasty in November 2012. In 2018, she had heart surgery in University Hospital in Lille, France.

Death 
Dikshit was admitted to Fortis Escorts Heart Institute on 19 July 2019 for cardiac arrhythmia and was put on a ventilator within a few moments of her admission. Her condition stabilised temporarily, however she did not recover from multiple cardiac arrests and her condition worsened during the following period. She later died at 3:55 pm on 20 July 2019, at the age of 81.

The Delhi government announced a two-day mourning period on her death, and accorded her a state funeral.

Awards and recognition
 2008 Best Chief Minister of India, by Journalist Association of India
 2009 Politician of the Year by NDTV
 2010 Dara Shikoh award by Indo-Iran Society
 2013 Delhi Women of the Decade Achievers Award 2013 by ALL Ladies League for Outstanding Public Service.

Gallery

References

External links 

 Official profile, Government of Delhi website

|-

|-

|-

1938 births
2019 deaths
Chief Ministers of Delhi
Governors of Kerala
Delhi University alumni
Indian National Congress politicians from Delhi
People from Kapurthala
Women in Punjab, India politics
Lok Sabha members from Uttar Pradesh
India MPs 1984–1989
Women chief ministers of Indian states
Delhi MLAs 2008–2013
Chief ministers from Indian National Congress
Women state governors of India
Women members of the Delhi Legislative Assembly
Women in Kerala politics
20th-century Indian women politicians
20th-century Indian politicians
21st-century Indian women politicians
21st-century Indian politicians
Women members of the Lok Sabha
People from Kannauj district
Punjabi women
Delhi MLAs 1998–2003
Delhi MLAs 2003–2008
Presidents of Delhi Pradesh Congress Committee